James Arthur Dean Wallace Anderson, known as James Anderson, is a retired member of academic staff in the School of Systems Engineering at the University of Reading, England, where he used to teach compilers, algorithms, fundamentals of computer science and computer algebra, programming and computer graphics.

Anderson quickly gained publicity in December 2006 in the United Kingdom when the regional BBC South Today reported his claim of "having solved a 1200 year old problem", namely that of division by zero. However, commentators quickly responded that his ideas are just a variation of the standard IEEE 754 concept of NaN (Not a Number), which has been commonly employed on computers in floating point arithmetic for many years.

Dr Anderson defended against the criticism of his claims on BBC Berkshire on 12 December 2006, saying, "If anyone doubts me I can hit them over the head with a computer that does it."

Anderson was banned from teaching transreal arithmetic at the University of Reading in 2019 when he was reported to have been teaching it during a class "Fundamentals of Computer Science". Anderson's nullity and transreal arithmetic are unaccepted by mathematicians and computer scientists alike, and is not a fundamental part of computer science. Shortly after, he quit, around the end of 2019.

Research and background
Anderson was a member of the British Computer Society, the British Machine Vision Association, Eurographics, and the British Society for the Philosophy of Science. He was also a teacher in the Computer Science department (School of Systems Engineering) at the University of Reading. He was
a psychology graduate who worked in the Electrical and Electronic Engineering departments at the University of Sussex and Plymouth Polytechnic (now the University of Plymouth). His doctorate is from the University of Reading for (in Anderson's words) "developing a canonical description of the perspective transformations in whole numbered dimensions".

He has written multiple papers on division by zero and has invented what he calls the "Perspex machine".

Anderson claims that "mathematical arithmetic is sociologically invalid" and that IEEE floating-point arithmetic, with NaN, is also faulty.

Transreal arithmetic

Anderson's transreal numbers were first mentioned in a 1997 publication, and made well known on the Internet in 2006, but not accepted as useful by the mathematics community. These numbers are used in his concept of transreal arithmetic and the Perspex machine. According to Anderson, transreal numbers include all of the real numbers, plus three others: infinity, negative infinity and "nullity", a number that lies outside the affinely extended real number line.  (Nullity, confusingly, has an existing mathematical meaning.)

Anderson intends the axioms of transreal arithmetic to complement the axioms of standard arithmetic; they are supposed to produce the same result as standard arithmetic for all calculations where standard arithmetic defines a result. In addition, they are intended to define a consistent numeric result for the calculations which are undefined in standard arithmetic, such as division by zero.

Transreal arithmetic and other arithmetics
"Transreal arithmetic" is derived from projective geometry but produces results similar to IEEE floating point arithmetic, a floating point arithmetic commonly used on computers. IEEE floating point arithmetic, like transreal arithmetic, uses affine infinity (two separate infinities, one positive and one negative) rather than projective infinity (a single unsigned infinity, turning the number line into a loop).

Here are some identities in transreal arithmetic with the IEEE equivalents:

The main difference is that IEEE arithmetic replaces the real (and transreal) number zero with positive and negative zero. (This is so that it can preserve the sign of a nonzero real number whose absolute value has been rounded down to zero. See also infinitesimal.) Division of any non-zero finite number by zero results in either positive or negative infinity.

Another difference between transreal and IEEE floating-point operations is that nullity compares equal to nullity, whereas NaN does not compare equal to NaN. This is due to nullity being a number, whereas NaN is an indeterminate value. It is easy to see that nullity is not an indeterminate value. For example, the numerator of nullity is zero, but the numerator of an indeterminate value is indeterminate. Thus nullity and indeterminant have different properties, which is to say they are not the same! In IEEE, the inequality is because two expressions which both fail to have a numerical value cannot be numerically equivalent.

Anderson's analysis of the properties of transreal algebra is given in his paper on "perspex machines".

Due to the more expansive definition of numbers in transreal arithmetic, several identities and theorems which apply to all numbers in standard arithmetic are not universal in transreal arithmetic. For instance, in transreal arithmetic,  is not true for all , since . That problem is addressed in ref. pg. 7. Similarly, it is not always the case in transreal arithmetic that a number can be cancelled with its reciprocal to yield . Cancelling zero with its reciprocal in fact yields nullity.

This is to say that nullity is absorptive over these arithmetical operations. Formally, let  be any arithmetical term with a sub-arithmetical-term , then  is a theorem of the theory proposed by Anderson.

Media coverage
Anderson's transreal arithmetic, and concept of "nullity" in particular, were introduced to the public by the BBC with its report in December 2006 where Anderson was featured on a BBC television segment teaching schoolchildren about his concept of "nullity". The report implied that Anderson had discovered the solution to division by zero, rather than simply attempting to formalize it. The report also suggested that Anderson was the first to solve this problem, when in fact the result of zero divided by zero has been expressed formally in a number of different ways (for example, NaN).

The BBC was criticized for irresponsible journalism, but the producers of the segment defended the BBC, stating that the report was a light-hearted look at a mathematical problem aimed at a mainstream, regional audience for BBC South Today rather than at a global audience of mathematicians. The BBC later posted a follow-up giving Anderson's response to many claims that the theory is flawed.

Applications
Anderson has been trying to market his ideas for transreal arithmetic and "Perspex machines" to investors.  He claims that his work can produce computers which run "orders of magnitude faster than today's computers". He has also claimed that it can help solve such problems as quantum gravity, the mind-body connection, consciousness and free will.

See also
Wheel theory
Division by zero
Extended real number line

References

Further reading

External links
Reading University profile page
Book of Paragon — personal homepage

Living people
Alumni of the University of Reading
Academics of the University of Reading
English computer programmers
English computer scientists
Members of the British Computer Society
Computer arithmetic
Place of birth missing (living people)
1958 births